The Serbian lowland is treated under Danube Plain (Serbia)
The Danubian Lowland or Danube Lowland is the name of the part of Little Alföld (Slovak: Malá dunajská kotlina) situated in Slovakia, located between the Danube, the Little Carpathians and all other parts of the Western Carpathians.

In terms of geomorphology, it forms one unit together with the Neusiedl Basin (Neusiedler Becken) in Austria and the Győr Basin (Győri-medence) in Hungary.

It is an extensive tectonic depression filled with layers of Neogene Quaternary to a height of between 100 and 350 meters.

It consist of the following two parts:
Danubian Hills (also translated as  Danubian Upland) in the north
Danubian Flat (also translated as Danubian Plain) in the south

Many urban and other settlements can be found in this primarily agricultural area. The towns Topoľčany, Nové Zámky, Komárno, Levice, Dunajská Streda and Galanta are administrative centers. They are centers of industry and the processing of agricultural products (mills, breweries etc.). Old wine growing towns (Svätý Jur, Pezinok, Modra) and health resorts (Piešťany, Dudince) can be also found in the lowland. See the articles of the two subdivisions for further information.

See also
Dunajské luhy Protected Landscape Area

Plains of Slovakia